Anicla infecta is a moth of the family Noctuidae, described by Ochsenheimer in 1816. It is known as the green cutworm when a caterpillar and the green cutworm moth when mature. It is found from south-eastern Canada (Nova Scotia and Quebec) through the eastern United States and until Uruguay.

The wingspan is 30–35 mm. Adults are on wing from June to September depending on the location.

The larvae feed on beets, grasses and tobacco. Adults are a pollinator of fetterbush lyonia.

References

External links
Image
Bug Guide

Noctuinae
Moths of North America
Moths of South America
Moths described in 1816